Mujatria (Kharosthi:), previously read Hajatria (ruled circa 10 CE, or 40-50 CE according to more recent research based on numismatics), is the name of an Indo-Scythian ruler, the son of Kharahostes as mentioned on his coins.

The archaeologists had discovered coins issued by a "son of Kharahostes," but the actual name of the person had been missing on these coins. The name of the ruler on the coins has finally been read as "Mujatria". His father Kharahostes is known through epigraphical evidence from inscribed reliquaries to have already been a king when the Indravarman Silver Reliquary was dedicated, which is itself positioned with certainty before the 5-6 CE Bajaur casket. Therefore the rule of Kharahostes is usually estimated to 10 BCE- 10CE, which suggests Mujatria would have ruled circa 10 CE- 30 CE.

According to Sten Konow's study of the Mathura lion capital, this person may have been Hayuara, who was the brother-in-law of Rajuvula. He ruled from around 10 CE as a satrap of the Mathura area. He is only known through his coins.

According to Joe Cribb however, the actual Mujiatria was located in the region of Jalalabad in eastern Afghanistan and lived in the later part of the 1st century CE.

A recent study (2015) by Joe Cribb suggests that the round debased silver coins with three-pellet symbols in the name of Azes, usually attributed to his father Kharahostes, should actually be attributed to Mujatria. The Bimaran casket may therefore have been dedicated during the reign of Mujatria.

Overstrikes of the Kushan ruler Wima Takto on Mujatria coins are known. This, together with various hoard finds, suggests the contemporaneity of Mujatria with the Kushan ruler Kujula Kadphises, predecessor of Wima Takto, and the Indo-Scythian ruler Sasan.

References

See also
Yuezhi
Greco-Bactrian Kingdom
Indo-Greek Kingdom
Indo-Parthian Kingdom
Kushan Empire

Indo-Scythian kings
1st-century monarchs in Asia
1st-century Iranian people